Brimer may refer to:-

Brimer Township, Barnes County, North Dakota, a civil township
Kim Brimer, a Republican member of the Texas Senate
Michael Brimer, South African-Australian composer, pianist and organist